Paul Joseph Mercurio  (born 31 March 1963) is an Australian actor, dancer, TV presenter and politician. Mercurio is best known for his lead role in Strictly Ballroom 1992 and his role as a judge on TV series Dancing with the Stars.

He has been an Australian Labor Party member of the Victorian Legislative Assembly since 2022, representing the electorate of Hastings.

Early life

Mercurio was born in Swan Hill, Victoria in March 1963, his father was character actor Gus Mercurio. Paul began ballet at nine. He later moved to Perth, Western Australia, where he attended John Curtin Senior High School, now known as John Curtin College of the Arts where there is a theatre named after him. He credits his theatre arts teacher for inspiring him to follow his dream. Mercurio focussed on acting during his high school years but after he graduated, he caught the Indian Pacific train from Perth back to Melbourne  where he studied at the Australian Ballet School.

By the age of 19 in 1982, he was Principal Dancer with the Sydney Dance Company—a position he held for ten years. During this time, he was commissioned to choreograph six works performed by the company. Mercurio left the Sydney Dance Company in August 1992 to found the Australian Choreographic Ensemble which danced from 1992 to 1995, where he was the director, principal dancer and principal choreographer.

Stage and screen career

Feature films 
Mercurio made his film debut in Baz Luhrmann's breakout film Strictly Ballroom, receiving an Australian Film Institute Award nomination in 1993. Mercurio was a choreographer on the film. Flamenco dancer Antonio Vargas, the actor who played Fran's father, also choreographed scenes in the film.

Mercurio's other film credits include: Exit to Eden, Back of Beyond, Così, Red Ribbon Blues, Welcome to Woop Woop, The Dark Planet, The First 9½ Weeks, Kick and Sydney – A Story of a City. He starred, wrote, choreographed, produced and directed the short film Spilt Milk.  Most recently, Mercurio has taken roles in independent films, such as Hunting for Shadows and A Silent Agreement with director Davo Hardy.

In 2019, Mercurio appeared in a supporting role as Sal in Promised (2019), a film directed and co-produced by Nick Conidi, and starring  Tina Arena, Antoniette Iesue and Daniel Berini. The film was released in Australia on 24 October 2019.

Baz Luhrmann expressed some interest in using Mercurio in Moulin Rouge to Mercurio's agent, but after a series of failed attempts to speak to Luhrmann personally, Mercurio found out that  there was no role for him in the movie via the production company.  He has not appeared in any other Luhrmann films and only appears briefly in Disc 4 of  Red Curtain Trilogy as a pixelated image.

Television roles  
Mercurio made his TV debut in a documentary on his life called Life's Burning Desire in 1992. He starred in the lead role of Joseph in the Emmy Award-winning US TV mini-series The Bible: Joseph in 1995. Later, he joined the ensemble cast for the 1998 mini-series drama The Day of the Roses, depicting the 1977 Granville railway disaster.
Throughout the 1990s. Mercurio guest starred in Australian TV shows including Blue Heelers, All Saints, Murder Call, Medivac, Heartbreak High, Water Rats and The Day of the Roses. 
Mercurio was a judge on the Australian version of Dancing with the Stars until August 2008, when he was dropped from the judging panel because he was deemed "too nice" for television.  He was also a judge in the New Zealand version. In 2008, he began hosting a series called Mercurio's Menu where he travels Australia, cooking in different locations.

Dance and choreography 
Mercurio continues to dance and choreograph professionally. He was a movement consultant on the Will Smith movie I, Robot, and has choreographed an American TV campaign for Coca-Cola, the Harry M. Miller production of Jesus Christ Superstar and Annie Get Your Gun. In January 2004, he appeared on stage in The Full Monty. Mercurio teaches students full-time at Dance World Studios in Melbourne.

Political career
Mercurio was elected as a councilor for Mornington Peninsula Shire in November 2020.

In November 2022, Mercurio was elected to the Victorian Legislative Assembly, winning the ultra-marginal seat of Hastings for the Australian Labor Party.

Personal life
Mercurio has been married to his wife Andrea since 1987, and together they have three children: Emily, Elise and Erin.

He appeared on the Australian version of the television show Who Do You Think You Are? in 2012 in which he discovered that his grandfather was a member of the Milwaukee division of Cosa Nostra (the Sicilian mafia) in the 1950s. Mercurio has reflected on this legacy in subsequent interviews and spoken about the effect it has had on his father, and his relationship with his father.

In December 2022, he was hospitalised with complications from atrial fibrillation following his election win.

Filmography

Awards

Mo Awards
The Australian Entertainment Mo Awards were annual Australian entertainment industry awards. They recognise achievements in live entertainment in Australia from 1975 to 2016. Paul Mercurio won one award in that time.
 (wins only)
|-
| 1992
| Paul Mercurio
| Dance Performance of the Year
| 
|-

References

External links
 
  at AustraliaDancing (archived)

1963 births
21st-century Australian politicians
Australian people of American descent
Australian people of Italian descent
Australian male dancers
Australian male film actors
Australian male television actors
Australian television chefs
People educated at John Curtin College of the Arts
People from Swan Hill
Living people
Members of the Order of Australia
Members of the Victorian Legislative Assembly
Australian Labor Party members of the Parliament of Victoria
Labor Left politicians